Ellen Witte Zegura is an American computer scientist who works as a professor in the School of Computer Science at the Georgia Institute of Technology College of Computing, and was founding chair of the school from 2007 to 2012. Her research concerns computer networks.

Zegura majored in computer science at Washington University in St. Louis, graduating in 1987, and remained there for her graduate studies. She completed her doctorate in 1993 under the supervision of Jonathan S. Turner, and joined the Georgia Tech faculty in the same year.

In 2013 she was named a Fellow of the Association for Computing Machinery "for contributions to communication and computation in intermittingly-connected networks."

References

External links

Year of birth missing (living people)
Living people
American computer scientists
American women computer scientists
Washington University in St. Louis alumni
Georgia Tech faculty
Fellows of the Association for Computing Machinery